National Route 124 is a national highway of Japan connecting between Chōshi, Chiba and Mito, Ibaraki in Japan, with total length has 88.1 km (54.74 mi).

See also

References

External links

124
Roads in Chiba Prefecture
Roads in Ibaraki Prefecture